Scopula leuraria is a moth of the  family Geometridae. It is found from central China to Korea.

References

Moths described in 1913
leuraria
Moths of Asia